The 1930 New York Giants season was the 48th in franchise history. The team finished third in the National League with a record of 87–67, 5 games behind the St. Louis Cardinals.

Regular season 
Giants player Bill Terry was the last member of the Giants, and the last National League player in the 20th century, to have a batting average of .400 in one season. In the process, he tied the National League record – set the previous year by Lefty O'Doul – for most hits in a single season with 254. As of the end of the 2020 season, that record still stands.

The Giants set a record for the highest team batting average (.319) in the modern era (since 1901). The team's totals of 1,769 hits and 2,628 total bases both set single season franchise records.

Season standings

Record vs. opponents

Roster

Player stats

Batting

Starters by position 
Note: Pos = Position; G = Games played; AB = At bats; H = Hits; Avg. = Batting average; HR = Home runs; RBI = Runs batted in

Other batters 
Note: G = Games played; AB = At bats; H = Hits; Avg. = Batting average; HR = Home runs; RBI = Runs batted in

Pitching

Starting pitchers 
Note: G = Games pitched; IP = Innings pitched; W = Wins; L = Losses; ERA = Earned run average; SO = Strikeouts

Other pitchers 
Note: G = Games pitched; IP = Innings pitched; W = Wins; L = Losses; ERA = Earned run average; SO = Strikeouts

Relief pitchers 
Note: G = Games pitched; W = Wins; L = Losses; SV = Saves; ERA = Earned run average; SO = Strikeouts

Awards and honors

League records 
 Bill Terry, National League record, most hits in a single season (tied with Lefty O'Doul)

League leaders 
 Bill Terry, National League batting champion

Farm system

Notes

References 
1930 New York Giants season at Baseball Reference

New York Giants (NL)
San Francisco Giants seasons
New York Giants season
New York
1930s in Manhattan
Washington Heights, Manhattan